The term golf property is used to describe a niche in the property market: residential real estate linked to a golf course. Golf property can be in the ownership of the golf course or in proximity to the golf course. The idea of combining the design of a golf course with a subdivision housing property originated in the US and is now found in many parts of the world.

In the United States, there are over 2,000 golf courses with surrounding residential properties.  Homes, townhouses, and condos make up the majority of golf properties in the US.  In recent years, the concept has gone global with golf communities stretching from Dubai to Australia.  Legendary golfers such as Jack Nicklaus, Arnold Palmer, and Greg Norman have played a key role in the increased rate of development through partnership with national and global home builders including Lennar, Toll Brothers, and others.

Luxury real estate
Golf terminology